Mihael Žgank (born 1 February 1994) is a Slovenian-born Turkish judoka.

Career
Žgank competed at the 2016 Summer Olympics in Rio de Janeiro, in the men's 90 kg, where he lost to Aleksandar Kukolj of Serbia in the round of 32.

At the 2017 World Judo Championships in Budapest, Žgank won the silver medal.

Later, Žgank switched nationality from Slovenia to Turkey due to financial reasons. He participated at the 2018 World Judo Championships in Baku under his new Turkish name Mikail Özerler.

He won one of the bronze medals in his event at the 2022 Judo Grand Slam Paris held in Paris, France. He also won one of the bronze medals in his event at the 2022 Judo Grand Slam Tel Aviv held in Tel Aviv, Israel.

References

External links

 
 
 
 

1994 births
Living people
Turkish male judoka
Slovenian male judoka
Olympic judoka of Slovenia
Judoka at the 2016 Summer Olympics
European Games competitors for Slovenia
Judoka at the 2015 European Games
Judoka at the 2019 European Games
European Games medalists in judo
European Games gold medalists for Turkey
Judoka at the 2020 Summer Olympics
Olympic judoka of Turkey
Turkish people of Slovenian descent
Sportspeople from Celje
Mediterranean Games gold medalists for Turkey
Mediterranean Games medalists in judo
Islamic Solidarity Games medalists in judo
Islamic Solidarity Games competitors for Turkey